4-alpha-D-{(1->4)-alpha-D-glucano}trehalose trehalohydrolase (malto-oligosyltrehalose trehalohydrolase) is an enzyme with systematic name 4-alpha-D-((1->4)-alpha-D-glucano)trehalose glucanohydrolase (trehalose-producing). This enzyme catalyses the following chemical reaction

 hydrolysis of (1->4)-alpha-D-glucosidic linkage in 4-alpha-D-[(1->4)-alpha-D-glucanosyl]n trehalose to yield trehalose and (1->4)-alpha-D-glucan

References

External links 
 

EC 3.2.1